Stephen Athipozhiyil (18 May 1944 – 9 April 2022) was an Indian Catholic prelate.

Athipozhiyil was born in India and was ordained to the priesthood in 1969. He served as coadjutor bishop of the Diocese of Alleppey, India, in 2001 and then as diocesan bishop of the Alleppey Diocese from 2001 until his retirement in 2019.

References

1944 births
2022 deaths
Indian Roman Catholic bishops
People from Alappuzha district